Taking the Stage is a musical reality show set at the School for Creative and Performing Arts in Cincinnati, Ohio.  It is produced by Nick Lachey, a SCPA alumnus, for MTV. The first season chronicled the lives of five high school students and their friends as they train for careers in the arts. The 2nd season aired from January to April 2010 on Thursday nights on MTV at 11 pm.

MTV canceled the show in May 2010.

Starring 

This is the Main Cast for all seasons according to MTV. For a full list of current and former cast members of Taking The Stage, see Seasons
  Main Cast Member

Seasons
For full cast descriptions, synopsis', episode guides, and more see below.
Taking The Stage (season 1)
Taking The Stage (season 2)

References

External links
Official Website

American LGBT-related reality television series
MTV original programming
Cincinnati Public Schools
Television shows set in Cincinnati
2000s American high school television series
2010s American high school television series
2000s American reality television series
2010s American reality television series
2009 American television series debuts
2010 American television series endings
Music of Cincinnati
Television series about teenagers
Works about performing arts education